Gbap is a small rural fishing town in Nongoba Bullom Chiefdom, Bonthe District in the Southern Province of Sierra Leone. The town is mainly inhabited by the Sherbro people. Gbap is the traditional home of the Sherbro Tuckers Family, descendants of an English slave trader and a Sherbro princess. It is also the birthplace of Patricia Kabbah (who is also one of the Sherbro Tuckers and the niece of Peter L. Tucker), former First Lady of Sierra Leone and wife of  Ahmad Tejan Kabbah, Sierra Leone's 3rd President.

References

External links
 http://www.maplandia.com/sierra-leone/southern/bonthe/gbap/

Populated places in Sierra Leone
Southern Province, Sierra Leone